This is a timeline of UK children's programming on non-BBC  and ITV channels.

1980s 

 1982
 1 November – S4C launches and programming for children is included as part of its remit with its programming block named Clwb S4C. 
 2 November – Channel 4 launches and programming for children is included as part of its remit.

 1983
 No events.

 1984
1 September – The Children's Channel launches. It broadcasts during the daytime hours, timesharing its cable slot with evening only services.

 1985
 20 July – Sky Channel launches a weekend morning children's programming block called Fun Factory.

 1986
 1 September – The DJ Kat Show launches on Sky Channel as a weekday children's programming block. It airs at breakfast and in the late afternoons.

 1987
 No events.

 1988
 No events.

 1989
 March – The Children's Channel starts broadcasting free-to-air on Astra 1A, airing from 5am to 10am on weekdays and from 5am to 12pm on weekends, time-sharing with Lifestyle.

1990s 
 1990
 17 September – S4C's children's block is renamed from Clwb S4C to Slot Meithrin.

 1991
 Following the launch of the Astra 1B-satellite, The Children's Channel's hours expand and it is now on the air until 5pm each day.

 1992
 The Children's Channel launches an early evening block showing programming of greater interest to older children and teenagers. The segment, simply called  TCC, airs from 5pm to 7pm.

 1993
 1 September 
The start of Sky Multichannels sees the launch of Nickelodeon. It is on air each day between 7am and 7pm.
The Children's Channel hours are cut back to 6am to 5pm to allow The Family Channel to share its space. This day also sees it become a pay television channel.
 17 September – Cartoon Network Europe launches, broadcasting from London. Broadcasting as a free-to-air channel, it is twinned with TNT and ran from 5am until 7pm.

 1994
 11 September – After nine years on air, the final edition of children's programming block Fun Factory is broadcast.
  Live presentation launches on Nickelodeon and is branded as Nick Alive!.

 1995
 May – Flextech completes its acquisition of The Children's Channel when it acquired the remaining 25.1% stake in Starstream for £15m. By that time, the channel is known on air as TCC and the year also sees the launch of a block of programmes for pre-school children called Tiny TCC, which airs each day between 6am and 9am.
 1 October – The Disney Channel launches. It is on the air as a premium channel as part of the Sky Movies package and airs between 6am and 10pm.
 31 December – Sky One's children programming block The DJ Kat Show is axed after almost a decade on air due to low viewing figures.

 1996
 August – Cartoon Network begins broadcasting for an extra two hours until 9pm, with TNT's hours moving to 9pm until 5am.
 2 October – Fox Kids launches. It broadcasts each day between 6am and 7pm and airs live-action and animated comedy, drama and action-adventure programmes for children of all ages, Fox Kids also broadcasts up to seven hours of advertisement-free educational series each week.
 October – Children's programming on Sky One is reduced following the launch of Fox Kids Network and most of the programmes shown on Sky One move to the new channel.

 1997
 3 February 
The programmes targeting older children which The Children's Channel was airing are split off into a new channel called Trouble with TCC reverting to the original name of The Children's Channel.
Tiny TCC is transferred to UK Living and renamed Tiny Living with its airtimes changing to 7am to 9am on weekdays and 7am to 10am during the weekend. 
 31 March – The launch of Channel 5 the previous day sees children's programming forming part of the output, including a 90-minute breakfast block called Milkshake! which runs on weekdays between 7:30am and 9am, this day also saw the first episode of Teletubbies broadcast on BBC Two.

 1998
 3 April – The Children's Channel closes down in UK and Ireland whilst TCC's Nordic channels followed in October 2000.
 17 September – S4C's children's block is renamed from Slot Meithrin to Planed Plant.
 1 October – The launch of Sky Digital sees Nickelodeon’s broadcast day ending three hours later at 10pm. 
 15 November – The public launch of digital terrestrial TV in the UK takes place with the launch of OnDigital and as part of the 19-channel line-up, Carlton creates three new channels for the platform, including a daytime channel for children,  Carlton Kids. Cartoon Network also launches on OnDigital broadcasting as a 24-hour service.
 December – Cartoon Network launches as part of the Sky Digital satellite platform.

 1999
 1 September 
Nick Jr. launches on Sky, allowing the channel to broadcast all day rather than just as a daytime programming block on the main channels which had been the case since 1995. It also airs on Sky's analogue service for the next year or so, airing between 6am to 12pm alongside Sky Sports 3, although this schedule would sometimes be altered if sports were being covered in the early morning.
 A one-hour timeshift channel from Nickelodeon launches. It is called Nick Replay.
 28 September – Playhouse Disney launches on The Disney Channel as a programming block aimed at the under-fives.
 15 October – Cartoon Network officially splits from the pan-European feed.

2000s 
 2000
 31 January – Carlton Kids stops broadcasting.
 1 February – Discovery Kids launches on the OnDigital platform as a direct replacement for Carlton Kids.
 27 May – Boomerang launches to broadcast classic cartoons from the Hanna-Barbera, MGM and Warner Bros archive programme library, as well as freeing up its sister network of many classics in the schedule.
 29 September – Playhouse Disney launches as a standalone channel alongside Toon Disney and Disney Channel +1 on the Sky Digital platform.
 Channel 5 launches a new programming block for older children. The Core is aimed at children ages 8 to 15 and airs on Saturday afternoons.  A number of originally commissioned programs are created for the block, such as Harry and Cosh and Atlantis High which are aired alongside imported teen shows.

 2001
 30 June – The analogue feed on Astra 1C of Cartoon Network and TCM ceases broadcasting, this was when Sky ended its analogue services.
 July – Disney acquires Fox Family Worldwide from News Corp and Haim Saban which gave Disney 76% ownership of Fox Kids.

 2002
 January – Channel 5's older children's programming block The Core is renamed to Milkshake! FM, taking its name from the established Channel 5 pre-school age slot Milkshake!. This block airs from 9am to 12pm on Saturdays and Sundays, while a number of programs aired during The Core continue to be broadcast during Saturday afternoons.
 22 July – Nicktoons was launched, airing Nicktoons cartoons.
 16 September – Milkshake! FM is rebranded again as two separate blocks, Shake! and Milkshake! Toons as Channel 5 is rebranded Five. 
 1 October – Toons & Tunes launches, broadcasting a mix of music videos alongside animated programming, aimed at 4 to 9-year-old children.
 14 October – CNX launches, targeting older children during the day and young adults during the evening. The station primarily aired anime, extreme sports and dramas, principally action/crime series such as The Shield and Birds of Prey. The channel's film telecasts predominantly consisted of martial arts films, anime films and action/drama.

 2003
 May – Toons & Tunes is relaunched as Pop. 
 8 September
Pop launches Pop Plus which is aimed at children aged 7 and under. It broadcasts between 6am and 8pm.
Toonami replaces CNX and moves from channel 244 to 621 on Sky and channel 148 to channel 732 on Telewest Broadband.
 November – Fox Kids begins broadcasting 24 hours a day, seven days a week. Fox Kids began broadcasting 24 hours a day, seven days a week

 2004
 Due to music videos becoming more adult in their content, the music video element of Pop is reduced with the animated content increased.
 31 May – Nick Jr. and Nick Jr. 2 launch a nighttime programming block dedicated to classic British children's programmes from the 1970s under the title  Noggin  running every night from 8pm until 10pm.
 July 
 The transition of Fox Kids to Jetix begins when a Jetix-branded block starts operating every day from 3pm to 7pm. 
 The Playhouse Disney block on The Disney Channel ends.
 Pop Plus is relaunched as Tiny Pop and the main channel is now aimed at slightly older children.
 September – The Jetix block on Fox Kids becomes part of the morning line-up between the hours of 7am to 9am. 
 October – Nicktoons TV extends its broadcasting hours by another 3 hours with a new block aimed at older children. The new slot is called Toonz2Nite and has a separate, distinct presentation from the main channel.

2005
 January – Fox Kids is fully relaunched as Jetix, a year after Fox Kids International had originally announced plans to rename its operations to Jetix which implied action and adventure.
 5 September – Noggin is rebranded as Nick Jr. Classics.
 October – Toonz2Nite is extended by an hour and is now on air until 11pm.

 2006
 Tiny Living comes to an end after 9 years as a breakfast pre-school slot on UK Living.
 March – Changes are made to Disney services in the UK. Disney Channel and Playhouse Disney stop being premium add-on channels. Disney Cinemagic is launched to take on the Disney slot in the Sky Movies premium bundle and replaces Toon Disney. Disney Channel +1 closed and was replaced with Disney Cinemagic +1.
 6 March – Boomerang launches a +1 timeshift channel.
 24 April 
Nick Jr. 2 launches. Rather than operating as a timeshift channel, it airs the shows broadcast on the main channel but on a different schedule.
Cartoon Network Too launches as the sister station of Cartoon Network, airing programmes a while after they are shown on the main channel. It airs from 3am to 7pm, sharing a broadcast frequency with TCM 2 from TCM. Initially it mainly broadcasts cartoons made by Hanna-Barbera.
June – Disney Channel +1 is relaunched.
 4 September – Cartoonito launches as a programming block on Cartoon Network Too running from 6am to 3pm.  
 15 October – Channel 5 launches Five Life and its pre-school slot Milkshake! airs each day between 9am and 1pm, beginning transmissions when Milkshake! ends on the main channel.

 2007
 28 February – Discovery Kids closes as it merges with Discovery Wings to Form Discovery Turbo.
 24 May 
BabyTV launches on Sky Digital.
Cartoonito launches as a full-time channel, running between 3am and 7pm in a time-sharing agreement with Turner Classic Movies 2.
 6 August – Pop Girl launches, airing each day between 6am and 9pm.
 Pop stops showing music videos and adopts a full-time animated series schedule.
 Channel 5's older children's programming blocks Shake! and Milkshake! Toons end although teen programmes aired on Saturday morning are no longer under a block of any sort on Channel 5.

 2008
 19 May –  Kix! launches. It replaces Pop +1.
 23 June – S4C launches a daily morning children's programming block called Cyw.
 18 August – Nicktoonsters launches as a spin-off channel of Nicktoons. Targeted to 5 to 11-year-old children and aired mainly older library content from Nicktoons, broadcasting for 12 hours a day from 7am to 7pm daily.
 December – Disney buys the remaining 26% share in Jetix to acquire full ownership of the company.

 2009
 4 January – Classic children's TV strand Nick Jr. Classics ends on Nick Jr and on Nick Jr. 2 in 2010.
 1 April – Trouble closes down after 12 years on air.
 31 July – Nicktoonsters closes after less than a year on air. It is replaced by Nicktoons +1, known as Nicktoons Replay with Disney Channel focusing more toward girls.
 4 October – Following the entry by Channel 5 into a strategic sponsorship with Disney, Shake! returns to air. Under the new arrangement, Disney sponsors the block and provides some Disney Channel programming for the slot such as Hannah Montana and Wizards of Waverly Place.

2010s
2010
 26 April – S4C launches Stwnsh, aimed at children between the ages of 7 and 13. It broadcasts on weekdays between 4pm and 6pm and on Saturday mornings between 9am and 11am. It replaces Planed Plant which has been on air since 1998.
 23 August – Nick Jr. begins broadcasting for 24 hours a day. 
 5 October – Nickelodeon launches a high definition simulcast channel. 
 18 October – Disney XD begins broadcasting a high definition simulcast channel.

2011
 Playhouse Disney is rebranded as Disney Junior.
 Early in the year, Cartoonito’s broadcast hours are changed and it now airs between 4am and 8pm.
 April – Pre-school programming on 5Star ends and the block is replaced by teleshopping.
 September – Cartoon Network HD launches on Sky.
 Channel 5 ends programming aimed at teenagers when it axes Shake!.

2012
 2 October – Nick Replay and Nicktoons Replay are renamed Nick +1 and Nick Jr. +1 respectively.

2013
 April – A high-definition simulcast of Disney Junior launches on Sky+ HD.
 July – Kix Power launches, replacing Pop Girl +1 on Sky.
 October – Kix Power is replaced by Kix +1.

2014
 20 March – Pop launches on Freeview but until April 2016 it is only available in areas that have a local television service.
 1 April – Cartoon Network Too closes and is replaced by Cartoon Network +1.
 June – Pop Max is revamped to target 7 to 17-year-old boys with a mix of cartoons, sci-fi, and action and adventure series.
 November – Nick Jr. 2 is renamed to Nick Jr. Too.

2015
1 October –  Pop Girl closes and is replaced by Kix +1.

2016
 April – Kix begins broadcasting on Freeview, transmitting on the same local-TV multiplex as Pop.
July – Nick Jr. HD launches on Sky.

2017
July – Disney XD's timeshift is rebranded for a month to "Spider-Man Channel" and in September 2017, it is temporarily rebranded as "Mickey and Pals", airing various programming from Disney Junior.
 August – Kix is rebranded as Pop Max, however, none of its programming changes.
 21 August – Milkshake! returns to 5Star where it airs from 9:15am to 11am. however, its run is short lived as it is dropped the following year.

2018
 15 January – Cartoonito begins broadcasting a 24-hour service.
 April – Disney XD is temporarily rebranded as Avengers channel, airing non-stop Avengers Assemble throughout the month as well as exclusive content to promote the release of Avengers: Infinity War. It reverted back on 30 April 2018.
21 July – Canadian children's channel ZooMoo launches on Virgin Media.

2019
  June – Pop Max moves to the G-MAN multiplex, meaning that Pop Max only broadcasts in Manchester on Freeview.

2020s
2020
 30 September – Disney Channel UK and its offshoots close. with the channels’ content transferring to streaming service Disney+.
 ZooMoo stops broadcasting in the UK after just two years.

2021
 No events.

2022
 31 October – Sky sells its stake in Nickelodeon UK Ltd. to Paramount Networks EMEAA; the Nickelodeon agreement had contained a non-compete clause that otherwise restricted Sky and Comcast from launching a children's television network while still holding a stake in Nickelodeon UK Ltd. Less than a month later, Sky announces plans to launch its own linear kids channel.

2023
 13 February – Sky launches Sky Kids to serve viewers aged 1–7. The channel doesn't carry any advertisements.

See also 
 Timeline of children's television on the BBC
 Timeline of children's television on ITV

References

Culture-related timelines
British history timelines
Television in the United Kingdom by year
United Kingdom television timelines